Missour (Amazigh: Misur, ⵎⵉⵙⵓⵔ) is a town in Boulemane Province, Fès-Meknès, Morocco. According to the 2004 census it has a population of 20,978.

Notable people 
Khalid Askri - Former international goalkeeper

References

Populated places in Boulemane Province
Municipalities of Morocco
Provincial capitals in Morocco